Udhaya deep is an Indian actor who is famous for his stint as a child actor. He is known for his role in Nila Kaalam (2001).

Career 
After acting in several films as a child actor, Udayaraj rose to fame for his role as Pulli in the television film Nila Kaalam (2001). His role was appreciated by critics with one critic from The Hindu noting that "Udayaraj as Pulli hogs the limelight" and how "He has absolutely no inhibition and is a natural". He was awarded the National Film Award for Best Child Artist for his role in the film. Udayaraj also starred in Thiruda Thirudi (2003) and is seen ripping a poster in a comedic sequence featuring Karunas. Udayaraj played one of Vijay's friends in Thirumalai (2003). In 2010, he made his adult acting debut with Baana Kaathadi portraying one of Atharvaa's friends. After the film, he went to work on STAR Vijay's Kalakka Povathu Yaaru as an assistant director. He played one of the leads in the low-budget Vandha Mala starring Sri Priyanka. He is set to star in an untitled film starring Ram Nishanth.

Personal life 
He married Janani Nivitha in May 2018.

Filmography 
 Films
All films are in Tamil, unless otherwise noted.

|
 Television
Marmadesam - Vidathu Karuppu as Mittai Mani
Kana Kaanum Kaalangal as a mechanic (season 1)
Vasantham
 Web series
Vella Raja (2018) as a drug peddler

Awards and nominations

References

External links 

Tamil male actors
Living people
Indian male child actors
Indian male film actors
Male actors in Tamil cinema
Male actors in Malayalam cinema
Year of birth missing (living people)
Best Child Artist National Film Award winners